Eighth Ministry of Machine-Building of the PRC (中华人民共和国第八机械工业部), one of the central offices in the People's Republic of China, established in 1964, which inter alia oversaw the defense industry.

In November 1970 merged with the First Ministry of Machine-Building, and partly with the Ministry of Agriculture and Forestry.

Again, the Ministry appointed 13 September 1979, while on September 10, 1981, was absorbed by the Seventh Ministry of Machine-Building.

See also
First Ministry of Machine-Building of the PRC
Second Ministry of Machine-Building of the PRC, ministry of nuclear industry
Third Ministry of Machine-Building of the PRC, ministry of aviation industry
Fourth Ministry of Machine-Building of the PRC, ministry of electronics industry
Fifth Ministry of Machine-Building of the PRC, ministry of tank equipment and artillery
Sixth Ministry of Machine-Building of the PRC, ministry of shipbuilding
Seventh Ministry of Machine-Building of the PRC, ministry of space industry

References

Citations

Sources 

 Malcolm Lamb: Directory of officials and Organizations in China, ME Sharpe Inc. Armonk, NY, 2003, p. 1911 +, Volume 1
 China's Economic System, Routledge Abingdon 2005, 594 p., 

Government ministries of the People's Republic of China